Tänassilma is a village in Viljandi Parish, Viljandi County in southern Estonia. The village has 148 inhabitants. The village includes Kalmetu School and the former Tänassilma orthodox church and cemetery.

Notable people
Politician Jaan Tõnisson (1868–1941?) was born near Tänassilma.
Poet and prosaist Viivi Luik (born 1946) was born in Tänassilma.

References

 

Villages in Viljandi County
Kreis Fellin